Anna Alexeievna Koltovskaya (Анна Колтовская) (c.1552 – 5 April 1626) was Tsaritsa of the Tsardom of Russia and the fourth spouse of Tsar Ivan the Terrible.

Life
After the sudden death of his third wife Marfa Sobakina on 13 November 1571, Ivan had difficulty in securing another marriage, due to the laws of the Russian Orthodox Church prohibiting fourth marriages; "The first marriage is law; the second an extraordinary concession; the third is a violation of the law; the fourth is an impiety, a state similar to that of animals." Ivan countered this by claiming he did not consummate his third marriage.

He married Koltovskaya, the daughter of Alexei Koltovski, a courtier, on 29 April 1572 without asking the Church's blessing. Ivan organised a meeting in the church of the Assumption, and gave a heartfelt speech which moved the prelates to tears. They agreed to Ivan's marriage, although on the condition that he not attend church until Easter, and that for a year, he spend time with penitents, and a year later, with common Christians. Their honeymoon took place in Novgorod, which only two years earlier had been decimated by Ivan in the Massacre of Novgorod.

After two years of marriage, Ivan began to tire of his wife due to her sterility. He repudiated her, and sent her to the convent of Vedenski-Tikhvinski where she assumed the monastery name of Daria. Only she and Maria Nagaya, the seventh wife of Ivan the terrible, outlived the tsar.

References
 Troyat, Henri Ivan le Terrible. Flammarion, Paris, 1982
 de Madariaga, Isabel Ivan the Terrible. Giulio Einaudi editore, 2005

|-

|-

16th-century births
1626 deaths
Wives of Ivan the Terrible
Year of birth unknown
17th-century Russian women
Russian nuns